Song Gun-hee (Hangul: 송건희, born June 26, 1994), better known by his stage name #Gun (Hangul: 샵건), is a South Korean rapper. He was a contestant on No.Mercy and Show Me the Money 5.

Career

2014–2016: Pre-debut and competition shows 
In December 2014, #Gun was announced as one of twelve contestants on Starship Entertainment and Mnet's survival show No.Mercy. While #Gun's rap garnered praise, and he made it to the show's finale, he was not one of the contestants selected to debut in Starship's new hip-hop group Monsta X.

In 2015 and 2016, #Gun released several mixtapes, through Soundcloud and Starship Entertainment's YouTube channel. His third mixtape, "Reload", was accompanied by a music video.

In 2016, he competed on Show Me the Money 5, but was eliminated in the finals. For the show he collaborated with artists like Mad Clown and Jessi. He was praised for his songwriting and raps on the show.

2016–present: Debut and early career 
In July 2016, #Gun released his first single "Beep". His second single was released the following year, titled "Sunflower Dance". In November 2017, he featured on producer D.I.'s debut track "Body Talk", alongside Solbin of Laboum.

Nearly a year after his last release, in August 2018, #Gun released the single "Red Light." He participated in the production of the song, as a credited writer and producer.

On April 1, 2019, #Gun released a new single "Aquarium", accompanied by a music video "Aquarium" was noted as a departure from #Gun's earlier sound, described as a more mature R&B song. In July, #Gun released the single "Park", with the B-side "Brake". In August, he released "Lord", with the B-side "Orange Room".

In April 2020, he released the single "Wednesday", with the B-side "Take it all".

Personal life

He is from the Gayang-dong area of Seoul. He is the cousin of Winner's Mino.

Discography

Singles

References

1994 births
21st-century South Korean  male singers
Living people
Show Me the Money (South Korean TV series) contestants
South Korean male rappers
South Korean hip hop singers
Starship Entertainment artists